Rama Bahadur Sinha (1910-1976) was an Indian politician.He was a member of the Rajya Sabha, the upper house  of the Parliament of India.
representing Bihar  as a member of the Indian National Congress.

References

1910 births
1976 deaths
Rajya Sabha members from Bihar
Indian National Congress politicians